The Ottawa Marriott Hotel (formerly  Holiday Inn Kent Street and Radisson Ottawa Centre Hotel) is a hotel located in Ottawa, Ontario, Canada, on the northwest corner of the intersection of Queen Street and Kent Street in downtown Ottawa. It is the 8th tallest building in Ottawa and 10th tallest building in the National Capital Region. The hotel is well known for the revolving room on its roof.

The Ottawa Marriott Hotel is located in the city's downtown core and is walking distance from Parliament Hill, Château Laurier, Rideau Canal, Rideau Centre, Shaw Centre, and the National Gallery of Canada. The hotel comprises 489 guestrooms,  of meeting space, a fitness centre, indoor pool and a children's activity area.

During its construction in 1971, the structure was briefly the tallest building in Ottawa until the neighbouring Place de Ville Tower C surpassed it during its construction. The hotel opened in 1972 as a Holiday Inn. It was later owned by Radisson Hotels before being taken over by Marriott Hotels & Resorts. In 2010, the building underwent significant renovations to the main floor. The top floor restaurant, Merlot Rooftop Grill (originally called La Ronde) closed and re-opened as Summit, a private event space. Summit remains the only revolving room in Ottawa, rotating at a rate of approximately one revolution per two hours. The main floor renovations included closing Cafe Toulouse, their street-level restaurant and re-opening as "spin" Kitchen & Bar.

See also
List of tallest buildings in Ottawa–Gatineau

References

Buildings and structures with revolving restaurants
Hotel buildings completed in 1972
Hotels established in 1972
Hotels in Ottawa
Marriott hotels
1972 establishments in Ontario